Pedro Pablo Pérez Márquez (born  February 7, 1977) is a Cuban professional racing cyclist. Known as "Pedro Pablo" by fans and competitors alike, Pérez is a five-time winner of the Vuelta a Cuba, a Pan American Games medalist, many times the National Champion of Cuba and a winner of international cycling events across the globe.

Cycling experience
Pérez is one of the greatest Cuban cyclists of all-time. He is a five-time winner of the Vuelta a Cuba (2000, 2001, 2004, 2007, 2008) – second only to his compatriot Eduardo Alonso with six. Pérez represented Cuba in the 2000 Sydney Olympics and qualified for the 2008 Beijing Games.

Career-ending Injury

Pérez missed the 2008 Games after suffering a near-fatal car crash in July. Details are unclear, but it is known Pérez was driving the car (a Lada) at the time when the crash occurred in San Cristobal, Pinar del Rio. Pérez suffered severe cerebral lacerations and spent several days in a coma. A female passenger was reported dead at the scene. He is receiving treatment at the Abel Santamaria hospital in the province of Pinar del Rio. Pérez intended to retire from cycling after the 2008 Olympics.

Palmares

1999
 1st in Stage 1 Vuelta al Tachira, Barquisimeto (VEN)
 4th in General Classification Vuelta Ciclista de Chile (CHI)
  in Pan American Games, Road, Winnipeg (CAN)
2000
 Vuelta a Cuba:
Winner stages 5 and 11A
Winner General Classification
 1st in Stage 10 Vuelta Ciclista del Uruguay, Montevideo (URU)
2001
 Vuelta a Cuba:
Winner Prologue, stages 1, 11A and 12
Winner General Classification
 National Road Race Championship
2002 1st in Clasico ciudad de Caracas, Elite/U23 (VEN)
 Vuelta a Cuba:
Winner stage 2
3rd place General Classification
 1st in Stage 12 Vuelta a Venezuela, Quibor (VEN)
2003
  in Pan American Games, Road, Santo Domingo (DOM)
2004
 Vuelta a Cuba:
Winner stages 1, 2 and 7
Winner General Classification
2005
 1st in Stage 6 Vuelta a Venezuela, San Diego de Alcalá (VEN)
2006
 Vuelta a Cuba:
Winner stages 1, 6 and 9
Winner General Classification
 2nd in National Championship, Road, Elite, Cuba (CUB)
 1st in Stage 9 Vuelta a Chiriqui, David (PAN)
 1st in Stage 2 Vuelta a Costa Rica, Playas del Coco (CRC)
 1st in Stage 9 Vuelta a Costa Rica, Pérez Zeledón (CRC)
2007
 Vuelta a Cuba:
Winner stages 4 and 5
2nd place General Classification
 1st in Stage 2 Vuelta a Costa Rica, Playas del Coco (CRC)
 1st in Stage 4 Vuelta a Costa Rica, Upala (CRC)
 1st in Stage 9 Vuelta a Costa Rica, Santa Ana (CRC)
2008
 1st in Stage 3 Vuelta al Tachira, Ciudad Bolivia (VEN)

Other
Pérez is the father of one child (a son, from his first marriage), and is currently married to Yoanka González, herself a World Champion in cycling.

References

External links
 

1977 births
Living people
Olympic cyclists of Cuba
Cyclists at the 1999 Pan American Games
Cyclists at the 2000 Summer Olympics
Cyclists at the 2003 Pan American Games
Vuelta a Venezuela stage winners
Place of birth missing (living people)
Cuban male cyclists
Pan American Games medalists in cycling
Pan American Games silver medalists for Cuba
Pan American Games bronze medalists for Cuba
Medalists at the 2003 Pan American Games
Competitors at the 2006 Central American and Caribbean Games